Fandi may refer to:

Given name
 Fandi Ahmad (born 1962), Singaporean footballer
 Fandi Utomo (born 1991), Indonesian footballer

Surname
 Ikhsan Fandi (born 1999), Singaporean footballer
 Ilhan Fandi (born 2002), Singaporean footballer
 Irfan Fandi (born 1997), Singaporean footballer
 Mohd Fandi (born 1992), Malaysian footballer
 Reza Fandi (born 1987), Indonesian footballer
 Zain Al Fandi (born 1983), Syrian footballer

Nickname
 El Fandi (born 1981), actual name David Fandila Marín, Spanish matador

Places
 Sheykh Fandi, Khuzestan Province, Iran